Heatonville is a settlement some 13 km north-west of Empangeni. Named after George Heaton Nicholls (1876-1959), member of Parliament for Zululand from 1920, later also Administrator of Natal and High Commissioner for South Africa from 1944.

References

Populated places in the uMhlathuze Local Municipality